The Lamoille Organization Camp, also known as Camp Lamoille and Elko Lion's Club Camp Lamoille, is a camping facility within the Ruby Mountains Ranger District of the Humboldt-Toiyabe National Forest. It was originally constructed in 1939. It is located in Lamoille Canyon, the largest valley of the Ruby Mountains, in Elko County, Nevada. It was a work of the Region 4 of the U.S. Forest Service. It was listed as a  historic district on the National Register of Historic Places in 2007, and was delisted in 2021.

Formerly used as a Boy Scout camp, the facility is currently managed by the Elko Lions Club and is available for rental.

References

External links

 Lamoille Canyon info including rental of the camp

Buildings and structures completed in 1939
Buildings and structures in Elko County, Nevada
Ruby Mountains
Lions Clubs International
Campgrounds in the United States
Humboldt–Toiyabe National Forest
Historic districts on the National Register of Historic Places in Nevada
National Register of Historic Places in Elko County, Nevada
Temporary populated places on the National Register of Historic Places
1939 establishments in Nevada
Former National Register of Historic Places in Nevada